Alberta Provincial Highway No. 54, commonly referred to as Highway 54, is an east–west highway located in central Alberta.

Highway 54 originally passed through Innisfail's central business district along 50 Street, ending at Highway 2 / Highway 590 interchange. In 2008, Highway 54 was aligned along a new bypass and linked to Highway 2 at an interchange that was previously opening in 2005.

Major intersections 
From west to east:

References 

054